Mount Olive English School is a high school in Siddhipur, Nepal.

Houses
There are four houses , Red , Blue , Yellow &  Green .

See also
 Anant English School
 Kopila English Secondary School
 List of schools in Nepal

References

Secondary schools in Nepal
Siddhpur